Sandefjord Turn- og Idrettsforening is a sports club in Sandefjord, Norway. The club has activities in basketball, handball, orienteering, athletics, skiing, volleyball, gymnastics and children's allsports.

Its local rival is IL Runar.

Handball
The men team won the 2005-2006 Norwegian national league.

External links
Sandefjord TIF (in Norwegian)
Sandefjord TIF Håndball (in Norwegian)

Norwegian handball clubs
Sandefjord
Sport in Vestfold og Telemark
Athletics clubs in Norway
Multi-sport clubs in Norway

de:Sandefjord TIF
sk:Sandefjord TIF Håndball